Devynock & Sennybridge railway station was a station in Defynnog, Powys, Wales. The station opened in 1867 and closed in 1962. It had a signal box and a small station building.

References

Further reading

Disused railway stations in Powys
Railway stations in Great Britain opened in 1867
Railway stations in Great Britain closed in 1962
Former Great Western Railway stations